In modern Greek history, paidomazoma ("gathering of children") may refer to:
 Devşirme, the practice of forced recruitment of Christian boys under the Ottoman Empire
 Paidomazoma (Greek Civil War), the forced evacuation of children from communist-held parts of Greece in 1948/1949

Greek words and phrases